Arthur Julian Andrew (1915, in Pictou County, Nova Scotia – 1994) was a Canadian diplomat. He was the Chargé d'Affaires a.i. to Austria and Czechoslovakia and the High Commissioner to Cyprus and the Ambassador Extraordinary and Plenipotentiary to Israel, Sweden and Greece. He was also an author of books about international relations.
Joyce Mowbray Sircom married Arthur Andrew in 1940. The couple had two daughters, Stephanie and Victoria. Joyce Andrew was one of the founding members of the External Affairs Wives Association (now the Foreign Service Community Association), a mutual aid group for families in the Foreign Service.

Notes

External links
 Foreign Affairs and International Trade Canada Complete List of Posts
 Library and Archives Canada biography

1915 births
1994 deaths
Canadian military personnel
Canadian non-fiction writers
Dalhousie University alumni
People from Pictou County
Ambassadors of Canada to Greece
High Commissioners of Canada to Cyprus
Ambassadors of Canada to Czechoslovakia
Ambassadors of Canada to Israel
Ambassadors of Canada to Sweden
20th-century non-fiction writers